Phryganeoidea, the giant caddisfly superfamily, may be paraphyletic with Limnephiloidea.

References 

Integripalpia
Insect superfamilies